Guillermo Luis May Bartesaghi (born 11 March 1998) is a Uruguayan professional footballer who plays as a forward for Danubio.

Career
A youth academy product of Nacional, May was part of club's under-20 team which won 2018 U-20 Copa Libertadores. He scored 4 goals from 5 matches in the tournament, including a hat-trick against Colo-Colo in group stage.

Deportivo Fabril, reserve team of Deportivo de La Coruña announced the loan signing of May in July 2018. He played 29 matches and scored four goals for the club in Spanish third division.

May joined Uruguayan top division club Cerro Largo on loan prior to 2020 Uruguayan Primera División season. He made his professional debut on 9 March 2020 in a 0–0 draw against Boston River.

Career statistics

Honours
Nacional
Supercopa Uruguaya: 2021

Nacional U20
U-20 Copa Libertadores: 2018

References

External links
 

1998 births
Living people
Footballers from Montevideo
Association football forwards
Uruguayan footballers
Segunda División B players
Uruguayan Primera División players
Club Nacional de Football players
Deportivo Fabril players
Cerro Largo F.C. players
Danubio F.C. players